Vicirionessa fuscimana is a jumping spider species that lives in Sierra Leone, Ivory Coast, Nigeria, Cameroon, Equatorial Guinea and was first described by Eugène Simon in 1903 as Viciria fuscimana.

References

Salticidae
Spiders described in 1903
Taxa named by Eugène Simon
Spiders of Africa
Fauna of Sierra Leone
Fauna of Cameroon
Fauna of Ivory Coast
Fauna of Equatorial Guinea
Fauna of Nigeria